Saint-Christophe-du-Bois is a commune in the Maine-et-Loire department in western France.

History
According to an unconfirmed tradition recorded in 1705, Saint Maurille, bishop of Angers, was the founder of Saint-Christophe in the 4th century.

A legend also reports that the first inhabitants of the town, having undertaken the construction of their village at a place called La Binaudière, drew an auspicious omen from a flock of crows which fell on them and carried branches to at the location of the present town.

See also
Communes of the Maine-et-Loire department

References

Saintchristophedubois